The Healer, a Cantata for St Luke was written by Karl Jenkins in 2014. Much of the text was written by Terry Waite, Vivien Harrison and Carol Barratt; the remainder is taken from St Luke's Gospel, the Book of Common Prayer and The Shepherd by William Blake.

The cantata's UK premiere was on 16 October 2014 in St Luke's Church, Grayshott, Hampshire, and was recorded and broadcast on Classic FM.

Movements

References

Compositions by Karl Jenkins
2014 compositions
Church cantatas